Jaspinder Narula (born 14 November 1970) is an Indian singer of playback, classical and Sufi music. She is known for her work in Hindi and Punjabi cinema. 
In 2021 she was selected by BJ Sam the Nigerian international singer and producer to represent India in the first universal Christmas music project with other global music icons including Hollywood Actor  Paul Raci, Swiss actress  Christina Zurbrügg,  Ghanaian Legendary singer  Diana Hopeson, 

She shot to fame after the duet "Pyaar To Hona Hi Tha" with Remo Fernandes from the 1998 film Pyaar To Hona Hi Tha for which she won the 1999 Filmfare Award for Best Female Playback Singer. The other notable films she has sung in include Mission Kashmir, Mohabbatein, Phir Bhi Dil Hai Hindustani and Bunty Aur Babli. She is also a singer of Sufi music, as well as Gurbani and other Sikh religious music. She has sung a latest Hindi Music video "Maula Ali Ali" with Mudasir Ali.

In 2008, she won the title of India's Best Live Performer in the NDTV Imagine singing reality series, Dhoom Macha De (2008).

Career

Jaspinder's career in singing began early. Her father Kesar Singh Narula was a music composer of the 1950s. She took her music training under the worthy tutelage of her father Shri Kesar Singh Narula and later from Ustad Ghulam Sadiq Khan of Rampur Sahaswan Gharana. Initially, Jaspindar Narula kept away from film singing and specialised in singing bhajans and Sufiana compositions. She moved to Mumbai a few years later at the advice of noted music director Kalyanji who heard her at the private gathering in Delhi and asked his son and music director, Viju Shah, to give her break in films like Master, Aar Ya Paar and Bade Miyan Chhote Miyan (1998).

She excels in singing folk and devotional songs. She has lent her voice to record numerous music albums for a large number of successful Bollywood films like Dulhe Raja, Virasat, Mission Kashmir, Mohabbatein and Bunty aur Babli to name a few.

Personal life
She lives in Mumbai, and is married to a Canada-based Indian businessman. Narula did her schooling from Guru Harkishan Public School, India Gate, New Delhi and completed her B.A Hons in Music from Indraprastha College for Women, where she was admitted as a special case because she did not have Music as a subject in class 12th which was pre-requisite for admission in the course. She finished PhD in Hindustani classical music from Delhi University in 2008.

She joined Aam Aadmi Party in February 2014.

Discography

Awards

References

External links
 
 Jaspinder Narula Filmography Bollywood Hungama
 Tare Hai Barati Chandni Hai Barat | Kumar Sanu, Jaspinder Narula | Virasat 1997 Songs | Anil Kapoor
 Tare Hain Barati with lyrics | तारे हैं बाराती की बोल | Kumar Sanu | Jaspinder Narula

Indian women classical singers
Indian women playback singers
Indian Sikhs
Filmfare Awards winners
Bollywood playback singers
Punjabi people
Punjabi-language singers
Performers of Sikh music
Performers of Sufi music
Living people
Indraprastha College for Women alumni
20th-century Indian women singers
21st-century Indian women singers
20th-century Indian singers
21st-century Indian singers
1970 births
Screen Awards winners